Hot Country Songs is a chart that ranks the top-performing country music songs in the United States, published by Billboard magazine.  In 1993, 33 different songs topped the chart, then published under the title Hot Country Singles & Tracks, in 52 issues of the magazine, based on weekly airplay data from country music radio stations compiled by Nielsen Broadcast Data Systems.

The number one song at the start of the year was "Don't Let Our Love Start Slippin' Away" by Vince Gill.  It remained in the top spot until the chart dated January 16, when it was replaced by "Somewhere Other Than the Night" by Garth Brooks.  Brooks also topped the chart with three other songs during the year, "That Summer", "Ain't Goin' Down ('Til the Sun Comes Up)" and "American Honky-Tonk Bar Association", giving him the most number ones of an artist in 1993.  The total of five weeks which the songs spent at number one was the highest total by any act during the year.  Tracy Lawrence and Vince Gill each had three number ones during the year, Gill's total including "The Heart Won't Lie", a duet with Reba McEntire.  The longest unbroken run at the top was the four weeks which Alan Jackson spent at number one with "Chattahoochee".

In 1993, Toby Keith, who would go on to become one of the most successful artists in country music history, scored his first number one when "Should've Been a Cowboy" reached the top spot in June. The song would go on to become the most-played country song of the 1990s, having received three million spins since its release, according to Broadcast Music Incorporated.  Other artists to reach the top spot for the first time in 1993 included Sammy Kershaw with "She Don't Know She's Beautiful" in April, John Michael Montgomery with "I Love the Way You Love Me" in May, Clay Walker with "What's It to You" in October, and Doug Supernaw, whose song "I Don't Call Him Daddy" was the final number one of the year.

Chart history

See also
1993 in music
List of artists who reached number one on the U.S. country chart

References

1993
1993 record charts
Country